"Summertime" is a song by American hip-hop duo DJ Jazzy Jeff & The Fresh Prince, released in May 1991 as the lead single from their fourth studio album, Homebase (1991). The song was produced by Chicago-based producers Hula and K. Fingers, and it won a Grammy Award for Best Rap Performance by a Duo or Group at the 1992 Grammy Awards. It spent a week at number #1 on the US Hot R&B/Hip-Hop Songs Chart, as well as reaching #4 on the Billboard Hot 100 (their highest charting single on the latter). It also became the duo's first single to enter the top ten of the UK Singles Chart, peaking at #8.

Background and composition
After Will Smith completed recording for the tracks produced by Hula & Fingers in Chicago for the Homebase album and was headed back to Philadelphia, the producers handed Smith the tape that would become "Summertime". Due to a delay in his flight back home, Smith wrote the entire song in one sitting and decided to record it in Chicago. Due to his voice being worn out from a previous night out, he recorded his song in a lower tone than his usual, unknowingly bringing out a style similar to rapper Rakim, in which Smith admired as one of his favorite rappers at the time. The song's instrumentation samples "Summer Madness" by Kool & the Gang, particularly the rising F# octaves played on an ARP 2600 synthesizer.

Critical reception
Steve Huey from AllMusic said that "Summertime" was "a warm, breezy reminiscence about growing up in Philadelphia and attending barbecues where the whole community showed up to see and be seen." He added, "It had all the good vibes of a typical Fresh Prince number, but it was clearly a more mature effort, and that's Homebase in a nutshell." Larry Flick from Billboard magazine wrote, "Pop/rap duo returns with this steamy hip-hop jam that is sure to quickly heat up radio airwaves thanks to its catchy chorus and clever wordplay." James Bernard from Entertainment Weekly described the song as "absolutely uplifting". Dennis Hunt from Los Angeles Times viewed it as a "strange cut", saying it's "just a laundry list of summer-is-fun cliches."

A reviewer from People magazine noted that "the musical backing is more sophisticated", viewing it as "a smooth Gershwin via Kool & the Gang version". Rolling Stone magazine ranked it number nine in its 2013 "Best Summer Songs of All Time", saying, "Over a funky laid back beat, a young Will Smith does a fantastic Rakim impression over a sample of Kool & the Gang's "Summer Madness" and drops a sweet ode to hanging out and driving around his native Philly: "Honking at the honey in front of you with the light eyes/ She turn around to see what you beeping at/ It's like the summer's a natural aphrodisiac." It's still hip-hop's finest summer celebration."

Track listing

 12" vinyl
 "Summertime" (DJ Jazzy Jeff Mix) – 5:37
 "Summertime" (LP Version) – 4:30
 "Summertime" (Instrumental) – 4:30
 "Girls Ain't Nothing But Trouble" (Shorter Single Edit) – 3:58

 CD single
 "Summertime" (Single Edit) – 3:57
 "Summertime" (DJ Jazzy Jeff Mix) – 5:37
 "Summertime" (Street Club Remix) – 6:06
 "Girls Ain't Nothing But Trouble" (Shorter Single Edit) – 3:58

 US CD single
 "Summertime" (Single Edit) – 3:57
 "Summertime" (LP Version) – 4:30
 "Summertime" (DJ Jazzy Jeff Mix) – 5:37
 "Summertime" (Extended Club Mix) – 5:43
 "Summertime" (Extended Bass Mix) – 5:36
 "Summertime" (Street Club Remix) – 6:06
 "Summertime" (DJ Jazzy Jeff Instrumental) – 5:50
 "Summertime" (Instrumental) – 4:30

 Summertime '98 CD single / 12" vinyl
 "Summertime '98" (SoulPower Radio Mix) – 4:12
 "Summertime '98" (SoulPower Hip Hop Mix) – 4:40
 "Summertime '98" (SoulPower Instrumental) – 4:16
 "Summertime" (Original Version) – 4:31

 Summertime (DJ Jazzy Jeff's 2007 Remixes)
 "Summertime" (DJ Jazzy Jeff's Still Summertime Remix) (Radio Edit) –
 "Summertime" (DJ Jazzy Jeff's SoleFul Remix)
 "Summertime" (DJ Jazzy Jeff's Still Summertime Remix)
 "Summertime" (Original 1991 Album Version)

Charts and certifications

Weekly charts

Year-end charts

Certifications

Film adaptation
On September 22, 2021, Smith’s production company Westbrook Studios and Davis Entertainment will co-produce the film adaptation with Peter Saji directing from his screenplay for Screen Gems.

See also
List of number-one R&B singles of 1991 (U.S.)

References

1991 singles
1991 songs
DJ Jazzy Jeff & The Fresh Prince songs
Jive Records singles
Music Week number-one dance singles
Songs written by Will Smith
Songs written by DJ Jazzy Jeff